Senator Ashe may refer to:

Samuel Ashe (North Carolina governor) (1725–1813), North Carolina State Senate
Thomas Samuel Ashe (1812–1887), North Carolina State Senate and Confederate States Senate
Tim Ashe (born 1976), Vermont State Senate
Victor Ashe (born 1945), Tennessee State Senate
William Shepperd Ashe (1814–1862), North Carolina State Senate